Bariša Krasić (born 16 September 1978) is a Bosnian professional basketball coach and former player. He currently serves as an assistant coach for Cibona of the ABA League and the Croatian League.

Krasić started his career playing with HKK Brotnjo Čitluk, the local club of his hometown of Čitluk near Međugorje, Bosnia and Herzegovina. He played for the Bosnia and Herzegovina national team. He last played for Velika Gorica.

References

External links
court-side.com

1978 births
Living people
Croats of Bosnia and Herzegovina
ABA League players
Artland Dragons players
Bosnia and Herzegovina basketball coaches
Bosnia and Herzegovina men's basketball players
Keravnos B.C. players
KK Cedevita players
KK Cibona players
KK Cibona coaches
KK Rabotnički players
KK Zadar players
Panellinios B.C. players
Basketball players from Mostar
Power forwards (basketball)
KK Gorica players